Djimalde Dossengar (born 31 December 1984) is a Chadian football midfielder and the member of Chad national football team. He has nine caps for national team, and he was a part of qualifying campaign for 2010 World Cup. Now he plays for Elect-Sport FC.

See also
 List of Chad international footballers

References

External links
 

Living people
1984 births
Chadian footballers
Chad international footballers
Association football midfielders
Place of birth missing (living people)